Cebu Catholic Television Network (CCTN) is a broadcast television channel owned by the Roman Catholic Archdiocese of Cebu and Fil-Products Group of Companies in the Philippines. The station's studios are located at the CCTN Broadcast Center, Cardinal Rosales Avenue, Cebu Business Park, Cebu City. CCTN 47 now operates 24/7 for cable operators and through online webcast, and 18 to 19 hours on free-to-air UHF TV. It is the Philippines' first ever Catholic television station on cable and free-to-air television and it's largest Asian religious broadcasting channel in Southeast Asia, Asia, behind Thailand's Dhammakaya Theravada Buddhist Global Buddhist Network (GBN).

History
Cebu Catholic Television Network Channel 47 (CCTN), founded by its president, Nonito “Dodong” Limchua, signed on in 2002 as the country's pioneer Catholic TV station. After his stint in the cable business, Nonito started family relationship programs that promote Gospel values, and bring the message and teachings of the Catholic Church to the people. Since he and wife Diana are devout Catholics, they have been involved in Walking with Jesus Seminars. Together, they shared their vision with the Archbishop of Cebu, Ricardo Cardinal Vidal, and he supported them in their desire for others to see the face of Christ through professional coverage of events, documentaries and issues concerning the Catholic Church. The impetus was the creation of a Catholic TV station on the same lines as EWTN and Catholic TV in the US but adapted for Philippine conditions. Just as Cebu proved to be the springboard for Philippine Christianity, its launch finally placed the country on the forefront of Catholic TV programming on par with other channels.

Just on its first three years since it was launched in 2002, CCTN gained popularity along Central Visayas and reached out its viewers to Eastern Visayas, Zamboanga Peninsula and Northern Mindanao.

Since it was launched, CCTN exists with various names. Started as CCTN on 2002, the station was rebranded as INTV in 2008 with the slogan Inform, Inspire, Interact. Following the rebranding was the station's website at intv.com.ph. Then in 2012, the network tries to bring back the CCTN name and rebranded as INTV powered by CCTN. In 2013, the network then removed the INTV name and rebranded as, CCTN 47. Their website was then moved to cctn47.com as their old website with the INTV brand was dropped.

Today, CCTN reaches its broadcast signals to Metro Manila, Cavite, Sarangani, Agusan del Norte, Misamis Occidental and Zamboanga Sibugay, via local cable providers.

Programming
CCTN's regular programming primarily consists of daily Catholic mass services and other Catholic-related programs, news and current affairs, serial and seasonal dramas, sitcoms, variety and talk shows, and canned programs; all are broadcasting in Cebuano language.

Affiliates
San Gabriel Productions
Total Viewing Productions
Cebu City Council
M-Talent Events and Promotions
DYRF-AM
DYLA
DYHP-RMN Cebu

See also
Catholic television
Catholic television channels
Catholic television networks
TV Maria

References

External links
 CCTN official website
 CCTN 47 on Twitch

Television in Cebu City
Television networks in the Philippines
Catholic television networks
Television channels and stations established in 2002
Philippine companies established in 2002
Mass media companies established in 2002
Religious television stations in the Philippines